Esper is a surname and given name. Notable people with the surname include:

Surname
Duke Esper (1868–1910), American professional baseball player
Dwain Esper (1892–1982), American film director and producer
Eugenius Johann Christoph Esper (1742–1810), German entomologist
George Esper (1932–2012), American journalist
Jan Esper (born 1968), German scientist
Mark Esper (born 1964), American politician
Michael Esper (born 1976), American actor

Given name
Esper Beloselsky (1871–1921), Russian prince, sailor, and Olympic medalist
Esper Ukhtomsky (1861–1921), Russian prince, diplomat, poet, publisher, and Orientalist

See also
Esper (disambiguation)